French Vietnamese or Vietnamese French may refer to:

Of or relating to any of the subdivisions of Vietnam during the period of French colonialism
Annam
Tonkin
Cochinchina
Tây Bồi, a French-based pidgin formerly spoken in Vietnam
French language in Vietnam
Franco-Vietnamese relations
French people in Vietnam
Vietnamese people in France
Eurasian (mixed ancestry) people of French and Vietnamese descent